Caryocolum laceratella is a moth of the family Gelechiidae. It is found in Slovenia and Italy.

The length of the forewings is 7.5-8.5 mm. The forewings are whitish, mottled with ochre-brown. There are two black stripes, irregularly extended from the fold towards the costa near the base and first quarter. Adults have been recorded on wing from late July to mid-September.

Pupae have been found from the end of August to mid-September close to Moehringia ciliata, which is possibly the host plant.

References

Moths described in 1868
laceratella
Moths of Europe